Antioch, Texas may refer to:

Antioch, Brown County, Texas
Antioch, Cass County, Texas
Antioch, Delta County, Texas
Antioch, Freestone County, Texas
Antioch, Henderson County, Texas
Antioch, Houston County, Texas
Antioch, Johnson County, Texas
Antioch, Lee County, Texas
Antioch, Madison County, Texas
Antioch, Panola County, Texas
Antioch, Shelby County, Texas
Antioch, Smith County, Texas
Antioch, Stonewall County, Texas
Antioch, Trinity County, Texas
Antioch, Van Zandt County, Texas
Antioch Church, Texas
Antioch Colony, Texas